Mesophleps ioloncha is a moth of the family Gelechiidae. It is found in India, Sri Lanka, Thailand, China (Anhui, Gansu, Henan, Shaanxi, Zhejiang), Taiwan, Indonesia, the Solomon Islands and the Philippines.

The wingspan is 8.5–17.5 mm. The forewings are yellowish white to ochreous brown, the dorsum is darker greyish brown.

The larvae feed on Tephrosia candida, Tephrosia purpurea and Crotalaria juncea. They feed in the pods.

References

Moths described in 1905
Mesophleps
Moths of Asia